Gabriele Colombo (born 11 May 1972 in Varese) is an Italian road bicycle racer. He won the Milan–San Remo in 1996.

Major results

1994
3rd GP Lugano
1995
1st Stage 3 Tour de France (TTT)
3rd Overall Vuelta a Burgos
1st Stage 2
6th Overall Tirreno–Adriatico
1996
1st Milan–San Remo
1st  Overall Settimana Internazionale di Coppi e Bartali
1st  Overall Giro di Sardegna
2nd GP Chiasso
4th Trofeo Laigueglia
5th Overall Tirreno–Adriatico
5th La Flèche Wallonne
5th Rund um den Henninger Turm
8th Firenze–Pistoia
10th Liège–Bastogne–Liège
1997
2nd Trofeo Pantalica
3rd Liège–Bastogne–Liège
7th Giro di Romagna
1998
1st Stage 4 Tirreno–Adriatico
1st Stage 6 4 Jours de Dunkerque
7th Trofeo Laigueglia
2000
1st Stage 5a Tour of the Basque Country
1st Stage 2 Setmana Catalana de Ciclisme
5th Overall Vuelta a Aragón
9th Overall Tirreno–Adriatico
2001
2nd Overall Tirreno–Adriatico
4th Overall Vuelta a Murcia
6th Milan–San Remo
2003
2nd GP Industria & Artigianato Larciano

External links

1972 births
Italian male cyclists
Living people
Cyclists from Varese